S.M. Joe Simon is an Indian film director, actor, lyricist, screenplay and story writer, known for his work in Kannada cinema.  Some of the films directed by Simon are Mr. Vasu (1995), Wanted (1993), Ravivarma (1992), Snehada Kadalalli (1992).

Selected filmography

As a director

Career 
Simon has been a part of more than 100 films in Kannada, either as actor, dialogue writer or director. He has served as the Vice-president of Kannada Film Directors Association (KANFIDA).

See also 

List of people from Karnataka
Cinema of Karnataka
List of film and television directors
List of Indian film actors
Cinema of India

References

External links 
 

Living people
Film directors from Karnataka
Kannada film directors
Male actors in Kannada cinema
Indian male film actors
Male actors from Karnataka
20th-century Indian male actors
21st-century Indian male actors
Year of birth missing (living people)